The 2012 Cyprus Women's Cup was the fifth edition of the Cyprus Women's Cup, an invitational women's football tournament held annually in Cyprus. It took place between 28 February – 6 March 2012.

Format
The twelve invited teams were split into three groups that played a round-robin tournament.

Groups A and B, containing the strongest ranked teams, were the only ones in contention to win the title. The group winners from A and B contested the final, with the runners-up playing for third place. The Group C winner faced the better 3rd place team from Groups A and B for 5th, with the Group C runner-up facing the other third place team for 7th. Group C's third place team faced the better fourth place team of Groups A and B, while the other two 4th place teams play in the 11th place match.

Points awarded in the group stage followed the standard formula of three points for a win, one point for a draw and zero points for a loss. In the case of two teams being tied on the same number of points in a group, their head-to-head result determined the higher place.

Venues
Games were played in five host stadiums in four cities.

Teams
Listed are the confirmed teams.

Group stage
All times are local (EET/UTC+2).

Group A

Group B

Group C

Knockout stage

Eleventh place match

Ninth place match

Seventh place match

Fifth place match

Third place match

Final

Champion

Goalscorers
5 goals
 Linda Sällström

4 goals
 Cha Yun-hee

3 goals
 Ana-Maria Crnogorčević

2 goals

 Sophie Schmidt
 Christine Sinclair
 Kelly Smith
 Louisa Nécib
 Marie-Laure Delie
 Gaëtane Thiney
 Melania Gabbiadini
 Patrizia Panico
 Amber Hearn
 Kim Little
 Nomathemba Ntsibande

1 goal

 Robyn Gayle
 Kelly Parker
 Melissa Tancredi
 Emily Zurrer
 Karen Carney
 Fara Williams
 Jade Moore
 Marianna Tolvanen
 Sonia Bompastor
 Eugénie Le Sommer
 Wendie Renard
 Alia Guagni
 Sandy Iannella
 Pamela Conti
 Lieke Martens
 Manon Melis
 Sherida Spitse
 Sarah Gregorius
 Hayley Lauder
 Jane Ross
 Leanne Ross
 Amanda Dlamini
 Yeo Min-ji
 Jehona Mehmeti
 Sandy Maendly
 Daniela Schwarz

Own goal
 Mandy van den Berg (playing against Scotland)

References

External links

2012
2012 in women's association football
Women